Fluide Glacial is a monthly Franco-Belgian comics magazine and a publishing house founded on 1 April 1975 by Gotlib, Alexis  and . It's one of the most successful comics magazine in France, along with Métal Hurlant.

Nowadays it also features the work of a new generation of authors and comics artists such as Riad Sattouf,  and Romain Dutreix.

It was owned by Groupe Flammarion from 1995 until 2016, when it was bought by Bamboo Édition.

 has been the magazine's editor in chief since 2012.

References

Sources
 Fluide Glacial publications by the year BDoubliées

External links
 Fluide Glacial official site 
 La mémoire de Fluide Glacial issue descriptions on BDoubliées 

1975 establishments in France
1975 comics debuts
Comics magazines published in France
French-language magazines
Magazines established in 1975
Magazines published in Paris
Monthly magazines published in France
Satirical magazines published in France